Ellen Fechner (1895–1951) was a German novelist and screenwriter.

Filmography
 My Wife Theresa (1942)
 I'll Carry You in My Arms (1943)
 Love Premiere (1943)
 Axel an der Himmelstür (1944)
 Film Without a Title (1948)
 Artists' Blood (1949)

References

Bibliography
 Baer, Hester. Dismantling the Dream Factory: Gender, German Cinema, and the Postwar Quest for a New Film Language. Berghahn Books, 2012.

External links

1895 births
1951 deaths
Writers from Berlin
20th-century German screenwriters